Aleksandr Vasilyevich Tochilin (born 27 April 1974) is a Russian football coach and a former player who played the most of his career for FC Dynamo Moscow and once represented Russia. He is an assistant coach with PFC Sochi.

International career
He played his only game for Russia national football team on 29 March 2003 in the UEFA Euro 2004 qualifier against Albania which Russia disappointingly lost 1–3. Tochilin was substituted at halftime.

European club competitions
With FC Dynamo Moscow.

 UEFA Cup 1996–97: 2 games.
 UEFA Intertoto Cup 1997: 6 games.
 UEFA Cup 1998–99: 2 games.
 UEFA Cup 2000–01: 2 games.
 UEFA Cup 2001–02: 3 games.

Coaching career
He led PFC Sochi to the Russian Premier League for the first time ever for the 2019–20 season, but was dismissed on 20 November 2019 with 1 point in last 5 league games and the team in last place in the table.

In January 2021, he was hired by third-tier PFL club FC Olimp-Dolgoprudny and led them to promotion to the second tier at the end of the 2020–21 season. He left Olimp-Dolgoprudny after the conclusion of the season.

On 19 August 2021, he joined second-tier club FC Kuban Krasnodar. On 12 October 2021, he left Kuban by mutual consent as the team lost 9 out of 11 games under his helm.

On 8 February 2022, Tochilin returned to FC Olimp-Dolgoprudny.

Honours

Player
 Russian Premier League bronze: 1997, 2008.
 Russian Cup winner: 1995.
 Russian Cup finalist: 1997, 1999.

Coach
 Russian Professional Football League Zone West best coach: 2016–17.
 Russian Football National League runner-up with PFC Sochi: 2018–19 (Sochi promoted to the Russian Premier League for the first time ever).

External links
 Page on the FC Dynamo Moscow site.

References

1974 births
Footballers from Moscow
Living people
Russian footballers
Russia international footballers
Association football defenders
FC Asmaral Moscow players
FC Dynamo Moscow players
Russian Premier League players
Russian football managers
FC Dynamo Saint Petersburg managers
PFC Sochi managers
Russian Premier League managers